Hadži-Prodan's rebellion was a Serbian rebellion against the Ottoman Empire, which took place from 27 September to 30 December 1814. It occurred between the First (1804–13) and Second (1815–17) uprisings of the Serbian Revolution.

Despite the collapse of the First Uprising in 1813, tensions in the Sanjak of Smederevo ("Belgrade Pashaluk") nevertheless persisted. In mid–September 1814 a rebellion was launched by veteran Hadži-Prodan (1760–1825) in the Požega nahija. He knew the Ottomans would arrest him, so he thought it would be best to resist them; Miloš Obrenović, another veteran, felt the time was not right for an uprising and did not provide assistance. 

The rebellion soon failed and Hadži-Prodan fled to Austria. After the failure of the revolt, the Ottomans inflicted more persecution against the Serbs, including higher taxation and forced labor. In March 1815, Serbs had several meetings and decided upon a new rebellion, the Second Serbian Uprising.

References

Sources

 (Public domain)

Serbian Revolution
19th century in Serbia
1814 in Europe
Conflicts in 1814
Serb rebellions against the Ottoman Empire
1814 in Serbia
Rebellions in Serbia
19th-century rebellions
September 1814 events
October 1814 events
November 1814 events
December 1814 events